Malampa is one of the six provinces of Vanuatu, located in the center of the country. It consists of three main islands: Malakula, Ambrym and Paama, and takes its name from the first syllable of their names. It includes a number of other islands – the small islands of Uripiv, Norsup, Rano, Wala, Atchin and Vao off the coast of Malakula, and the volcanic island of Lopevi (currently uninhabited). Also included are the Maskelynes Islands and some more small islands along the south coast of Malakula.

Population
It has a population of 36,722 (2009 census)  people and an area of 2,779 km2. Its capital is Lakatoro on Malakula.

Islands

Mountains
 Pénot
 Maroum

Bays
 Black Sand Bay
 South West Bay

References

 
Provinces of Vanuatu
States and territories established in 1994